Robert Davis "Bobby" McKenzie III (19 December 1928 – 4 January 2012) was an Australian rules football player, who played 125 games for the Melbourne Football Club in the Victorian Football League (VFL) between 1948 and 1955.

His son, Robert McKenzie played 42 games for Melbourne in the late 1960s and early 1970s.

References

External links

Melbourne Football Club players
1928 births
2012 deaths
Australian rules footballers from Victoria (Australia)
Melbourne Football Club Premiership players
Two-time VFL/AFL Premiership players